Baile Uí Dhálaigh (Irish for 'Ó Dálaigh's town') may refer to several places on the island of Ireland:

 Ballygawley, County Tyrone, Northern Ireland, a village
 Ballynasaggart Friary, a  16th century Franciscan friary near the village — see List of monastic houses in County Tyrone 
 Dalystown, County Westmeath, Republic of Ireland, a village
 Ballygawley, County Sligo, Republic of Ireland, a village
 A townland in County Londonderry, Northern Ireland — see List of townlands in County Londonderry